Eddie J. Nelson is an American sound engineer. He won four Primetime Emmy Awards and was nominated for thirteen more in the category Outstanding Sound Mixing.

Filmography 
 Guest in the House (1944)
 Captain Kidd (1945)
 White Pongo (1945)
 Apology for Murder (1945)
 The Story of G.I. Joe (1945)
 Guest Wife (1945)
 Paris Underground (1945)
 The Bachelor's Daughters (1946)
 The Red House (1947)
 California Dreaming (1979)
 The Evictors (1979)
 The Jerk (1979)
 Amber Waves (1980)

References

External links 

Possibly living people
Place of birth missing (living people)
Year of birth missing (living people)
American audio engineers
20th-century American engineers
Primetime Emmy Award winners